Newark station may refer to:

In the United Kingdom
In Newark-on-Trent, Nottinghamshire
Newark Castle railway station on the Nottingham to Lincoln line
Newark North Gate railway station on the East Coast Main Line

In the United States
In Newark, Delaware
Newark station (Delaware) on Amtrak's Northeast Corridor

In Newark, New Jersey
Newark Broad Street Station, a New Jersey Transit commuter rail station
Newark Liberty International Airport Station, a rail station 
Pennsylvania Station (Newark), also known as Newark Penn Station, a major transportation hub

See also
 List of Newark City Subway stations in Newark, New Jersey and its suburbs